Lake Akyayan is a lagoon in Turkey.

It is separated from the Mediterranean coast by a thin strip. It is a shallow lake and at times connected both to sea and to Ceyhan River which is to the east of the lake. Thus the salinity of the lake is low. The lake environment is  rich in fauna  But the sand movement threatens the lagoon and the marine fauna is affected. Thus  of land around the lagoon will be afforested by the Ministry of Forestry.

References

Akyayan
Landforms of Adana Province
Karataş
Akyayan
Important Bird Areas of Turkey